Prasinocyma is a genus of moths in the family Geometridae.

Selected species
 Prasinocyma absimilis Warren, 1901
 Prasinocyma acutipennis Wiltshire, 1994
 Prasinocyma aetheraea Debauche, 1937
 Prasinocyma agglomerata Herbulot, 1996
 Prasinocyma albicosta Walker, 1861
 Prasinocyma albinotata Prout, 1915
 Prasinocyma albiseriata Warren, 1906
 Prasinocyma albisticta Warren, 1901
 Prasinocyma albivenata Herbulot, 1983
 Prasinocyma allocraspeda Prout, 1924
 Prasinocyma amharensis Hausmann, Sciarretta & Parisi, 2016
 Prasinocyma ampla Warren, 1904
 Prasinocyma anadyomene Townsend, 1952
 Prasinocyma angiana Joicey & Talbot, 1917
 Prasinocyma angolica Prout, 1930
 Prasinocyma angulifera Hausmann, Sciarretta & Parisi, 2016
 Prasinocyma angulilinea Warren, 1912
 Prasinocyma annexa Prout, 1924
 Prasinocyma anomoea Turner, 1910
 Prasinocyma aquamarina Hausmann, Sciarretta & Parisi, 2016
 Prasinocyma arabica Wiltshire, 1982
 Prasinocyma bamenda Herbulot, 1982
 Prasinocyma batesi
 Prasinocyma baumgaertneri Hausmann, Sciarretta & Parisi, 2016
 Prasinocyma beryllaria Hausmann, Sciarretta & Parisi, 2016
 Prasinocyma bicolor Warren, 1907
 Prasinocyma bifimbriata Prout, 1912
 Prasinocyma bilobata D. S. Fletcher, 1978
 Prasinocyma bipunctata Prout, 1913
 Prasinocyma bongaensis Hausmann, Sciarretta & Parisi, 2016
 Prasinocyma caecata D. S. Fletcher, 1958
 Prasinocyma caeruleotincta Prout, 1912
 Prasinocyma camerunalta Herbulot, 1986
 Prasinocyma candida Prout, 1923
 Prasinocyma caniola Warren, 1903
 Prasinocyma cellularia (Guenée, 1862)
 Prasinocyma centralis Prout, 1915
 Prasinocyma chloroprosopa Prout, 1913
 Prasinocyma coerulea Warren, 1903
 Prasinocyma congrua Walker, 1869
 Prasinocyma consobrina Warren, 1912
 Prasinocyma convergens Warren, 1907
 Prasinocyma corolla Prout, 1913
 Prasinocyma corrugata D. S. Fletcher, 1958
 Prasinocyma crenulata D. S. Fletcher, 1958
 Prasinocyma croca D. S. Fletcher, 1978
 Prasinocyma crossota Meyrick, 1888
 Prasinocyma debilis Prout, 1913
 Prasinocyma decisissima Walker, 1861
 Prasinocyma delicataria Möschler, 1887
 Prasinocyma dentatilineata Prout, 1913
 Prasinocyma deviata Prout, 1913
 Prasinocyma differens (Warren, 1902)
 Prasinocyma dioscorodes Prout, 1913
 Prasinocyma discata Warren, 1906
 Prasinocyma discipuncta Hausmann, Sciarretta & Parisi, 2016
 Prasinocyma discoprivata Prout, 1913
 Prasinocyma dohertyi Warren, 1903
 Prasinocyma dorsipunctata Warren, 1911
 Prasinocyma edwardsi D. S. Fletcher, 1958
 Prasinocyma eichhhorni Prout, 1926
 Prasinocyma eichhorni Prout, 1920
 Prasinocyma eremica Wiltshire, 1980
 Prasinocyma exililinea Warren, 1906
 Prasinocyma fallax Hausmann, Sciarretta & Parisi, 2016
 Prasinocyma flavilimes Warren, 1906
 Prasinocyma florediscata Warren, 1907
 Prasinocyma fragilis Warren, 1903
 Prasinocyma fraterna Warren, 1907
 Prasinocyma furcata D. S. Fletcher, 1963
 Prasinocyma fusca Hausmann, Sciarretta & Parisi, 2016
 Prasinocyma gajdacsi Prout, 1930
 Prasinocyma geminata Prout, 1913
 Prasinocyma geminipuncta Warren, 1906
 Prasinocyma gemmatimargo Prout, 1915
 Prasinocyma gemmifera Hausmann, Sciarretta & Parisi, 2016
 Prasinocyma geometrica Prout, 1913
 Prasinocyma germinaria (Guenée, 1857)
 Prasinocyma getachewi Hausmann, Sciarretta & Parisi, 2016
 Prasinocyma glauca Warren, 1907
 Prasinocyma hadrata (Felder, 1875)
 Prasinocyma hailei Debauche, 1937
 Prasinocyma hiaraka Viette, 1981
 Prasinocyma ibandana Debauche, 1941
 Prasinocyma idiotica Prout, 1930
 Prasinocyma immaculata (Thunberg, 1784)
 Prasinocyma inconspicuata D. S. Fletcher, 1958
 Prasinocyma indentilinea Warren, 1912
 Prasinocyma indistincta Warren, 1903
 Prasinocyma infirma Prout, 1913
 Prasinocyma inornata D. S. Fletcher, 1958
 Prasinocyma intermedia Warren, 1907
 Prasinocyma inturbida Prout, 1924
 Prasinocyma inversicaulis Prout, 1913
 Prasinocyma iosticta (Meyrick, 1888)
 Prasinocyma iseres Turner, 1922
 Prasinocyma jefferyi Prout, 1930
 Prasinocyma laticostata Warren, 1906
 Prasinocyma latistriga Warren, 1906
 Prasinocyma leucocycla Herbulot, 1982
 Prasinocyma leucophracta Prout, 1932
 Prasinocyma leveneorum Hausmann, Sciarretta & Parisi, 2016
 Prasinocyma limpida Prout, 1922
 Prasinocyma lindemannae D. S. Fletcher, 1958
 Prasinocyma loveridgei Prout, 1926
 Prasinocyma lutulenta Hausmann, Sciarretta & Parisi, 2016
 Prasinocyma magica Hausmann, Sciarretta & Parisi, 2016
 Prasinocyma marginepunctata Warren, 1903
 Prasinocyma marina Warren, 1907
 Prasinocyma megacydes Prout, 1930
 Prasinocyma melanostigma Herbulot, 1996
 Prasinocyma minutapuncta Warren, 1903
 Prasinocyma monikae Hausmann, Sciarretta & Parisi, 2016
 Prasinocyma nandiensis Prout, 1930
 Prasinocyma neavei Prout, 1912
 Prasinocyma neglecta Prout, 1921
 Prasinocyma nereis Townsend, 1952
 Prasinocyma nictata Prout, 1913
 Prasinocyma nigrimacula Prout, 1915
 Prasinocyma nigripunctata (Warren, 1897)
 Prasinocyma niphobola Prout, 1930
 Prasinocyma niphosporas Prout, 1930
 Prasinocyma nivisparsa (Butler, 1882)
 Prasinocyma nonyma Prout, 1926
 Prasinocyma oblita Prout, 1930
 Prasinocyma obsoleta Warren, 1906
 Prasinocyma oculata Prout, 1915
 Prasinocyma ocyptera Meyrick, 1888
 Prasinocyma ornatifimbria Warren, 1903
 Prasinocyma oxybeles Prout, 1913
 Prasinocyma oxycentra (Meyrick, 1888)
 Prasinocyma pallidulata (Mabille 1880)
 Prasinocyma panchlora Prout, 1913
 Prasinocyma pavlitzkiae D. S. Fletcher, 1958
 Prasinocyma pedicata D. S. Fletcher, 1956
 Prasinocyma periculosa Warren, 1903
 Prasinocyma perineti Viette, 1981
 Prasinocyma peristicta West, 1930
 Prasinocyma permagna Herbulot, 1982
 Prasinocyma permitis Prout, 1932
 Prasinocyma perpolluta Prout, 1913
 Prasinocyma perpulverata Prout, 1916
 Prasinocyma philocala Prout, 1924
 Prasinocyma phoenicogramma Prout, 1913
 Prasinocyma phyllosa (Pagenstecher, 1886)
 Prasinocyma pictifimbria Warren, 1904
 Prasinocyma polluta Warren, 1903
 Prasinocyma pomonae Warren, 1912
 Prasinocyma pratti Prout, 1924
 Prasinocyma pulchraria Swinhoe, 1904
 Prasinocyma pumilata D. S. Fletcher, 1956
 Prasinocyma punctifimbria Warren, 1904
 Prasinocyma punctilligera Warren, 1906
 Prasinocyma punctulata Warren, 1903
 Prasinocyma pupillata (Warren, 1902)
 Prasinocyma rhodocosma (Meyrick, 1888)
 Prasinocyma rhodocycla Prout, 1917
 Prasinocyma rhodostigma Prout, 1916
 Prasinocyma robusta Hausmann, Sciarretta & Parisi, 2016
 Prasinocyma rubrimacula (Warren, 1899)
 Prasinocyma rudipunctata Prout, 1924
 Prasinocyma ruficollis Prout, 1913
 Prasinocyma ruficosta Warren, 1906
 Prasinocyma ruficulmen Prout, 1913
 Prasinocyma rufimargo Warren, 1912
 Prasinocyma rufistriga Warren, 1906
 Prasinocyma rugistrigula Prout, 1912
 Prasinocyma salutaria (Swinhoe, 1904)
 Prasinocyma sanguinicosta Prout, 1912
 Prasinocyma scintillans Warren, 1906
 Prasinocyma semicincta Herbulot, 1982
 Prasinocyma semicrocea Walker, 1861
 Prasinocyma seminivea Warren, 1906
 Prasinocyma septentrionalis Hausmann, Sciarretta & Parisi, 2016
 Prasinocyma serratilinea Warren, 1912
 Prasinocyma shoa
 Prasinocyma signifera Warren, 1903
 Prasinocyma simiaria (Guenée, 1857)
 Prasinocyma simplex Warren, 1912
 Prasinocyma simpliciata D. S. Fletcher, 1958
 Prasinocyma sororcula Warren, 1907
 Prasinocyma stefani Hausmann, Sciarretta & Parisi, 2016
 Prasinocyma stictimargo (Warren, 1902)
 Prasinocyma stictoloma Prout, 1928
 Prasinocyma syntyche Prout, 1913
 Prasinocyma tandi Bethune-Baker, 1913
 Prasinocyma tenera Warren, 1903
 Prasinocyma tetracosmia Prout, 1930
 Prasinocyma tranquilla Prout, 1917
 Prasinocyma transita Prout, 1930
 Prasinocyma trematerrai Hausmann, Sciarretta & Parisi, 2016
 Prasinocyma triangulata D. S. Fletcher, 1958
 Prasinocyma tricolorifrons (Prout, 1913)
 Prasinocyma trifilifimbria Prout, 1915
 Prasinocyma triglena Prout, 1930
 Prasinocyma tripuncta Prout, 1913
 Prasinocyma tryphera Prout, 1924
 Prasinocyma turlini Herbulot, 1982
 Prasinocyma vagabunda Warren, 1903
 Prasinocyma vagilinea Prout, 1911
 Prasinocyma vagrans Prout, 1913
 Prasinocyma venata Prout, 1913
 Prasinocyma vermicularia (Guenée, 1857)
 Prasinocyma vestigiata Warren, 1906
 Prasinocyma votiva Prout, 1913

References
Warren, W. 1897. "New genera and species of moths from the Old-World regions in the Tring Museum". Novitates Zoologicae. 4:12–130.

Encyclopedia of Life

Geometrinae